Yağmur Sarıgül (born 26 August 1979) is a Turkish songwriter and the electric guitarist of the rock band maNga. He writes both lyrics and music.

Yağmur "Yamyam" Sarıgül was born in Antalya, Turkey on 26 August 1979 but grew up and discovered music in Ankara. Hailing from a musical family (father plays Ney, mother plays Oud) Sarıgül was accepted into Hacettepe University State Conservatory at the age of 10 for both classical dance and music. He chose music.

After studies in violin through Bilkent University Stage Arts Faculty and continued education in piano and guitar through the conservatory, Sarıgül applied to Ankara Anatolian Arts High School.

After graduation, Sarıgül applied and was accepted to the Gazi University music program. During these years he played with Ankara bands "Laterna" and "6/8" then eventually envisioned, founded and created his most successful band "maNga" in 2001. He was awarded the "Best Musician" title at "Sing Your Song" music contest in 2001 where maNga finished second. The band went on to create two hit albums. Sarıgül's band was awarded "Europe's Favourite Act" at the MTV EMA's 2009 in Berlin, Germany and won second at the Eurovision Song Contest 2010 in Oslo, Norway for their hit song "We Could Be the Same"; produced by Sarıgül.

Sarıgül was Assistant Producer for maNga's debut album maNga and second album Şehr-i Hüzün. He is the sole Producer for maNga's new acoustic album project. During concerts he uses seven string guitars and keyboards.

Compositions

Own songs
maNga album

 Açılış
 Kal Yanımda
 Yalan
 Libido
 Yalan 2
 maNgara
 Kapanış
 Kandırma Kendini
 Üryan Geldim
 Alışırım Gözlerimi Kapamaya
 En Güzel Şarkım
 Yarın Doğar Güneş Elbet Yine

Co-written songs
 Bitti Rüya
 Music: with Ferman Akgül
 Lyrics: with Ferman Akgül, Özgür Can Öney, Haluk Kurosman
 Dursun Zaman
 Music: with maNga
 İtildik
 Lyrics: Ferman Akgül
 Music: with Ferman Akgül
 Kapkaç
 Lyrics: with Ferman Akgül
 Sakın Bana Söyleme
 Lyrics: with Ferman Akgül
 Ben Bir Palyaçoyum

Cover songs
Yağmur also covered other artists' songs re-arranging the music.

 "İz Bırakanlar Unutulmaz" in album maNga; original by Vega
 "Raptiye Rap Rap", in the memory album Mutlaka Yavrum of Cem Karaca
 "Beni Benimle Bırak"

References

External links
 The Artist's Official site (TR)
 maNga official site (TR-EN)

1979 births
Living people
People from Antalya
Seven-string guitarists
Turkish rock guitarists
Turkish rock musicians
Turkish songwriters
21st-century guitarists
Eurovision Song Contest entrants of 2010
Eurovision Song Contest entrants for Turkey